Prepcom is an acronym for Preparatory Committee and may refer to:
Preparatory Committee for an Arms Trade Treaty
Comprehensive Nuclear-Test-Ban Treaty Organization Preparatory Commission